Ellen Louise Wilson (née Axson; May 15, 1860 – August 6, 1914) was the first wife of President Woodrow Wilson and the mother of their three daughters. Like her husband, she was a Southerner, as well as the daughter of a clergyman. She was born in Savannah, Georgia, but raised in Rome, Georgia. Having an artistic bent, she studied at the Art Students League of New York before her marriage, and continued to produce art in later life.

She was the first lady of the United States from Wilson's inauguration in 1913 until her death. During that period, she arranged White House weddings for two of their daughters. She was the third First Lady, and the most recent, to die during her tenancy.

Biography
Ellen Louise Axson, born in Savannah, Georgia, the daughter of the Reverend Samuel Edward Axson, a Presbyterian minister, and his wife Margaret Jane (née Hoyt) Axson, Ellen became a woman of refined tastes with a fondness for art, music, and literature. When she was eleven years old, she began studying art at Rome Female College in Rome, Georgia. After her graduation in 1876, Ellen's drawing titled School Scene was submitted to the Paris International Exposition. where it won a bronze medal for excellence.

In April 1883, she met Woodrow Wilson when he was visiting his cousin Jesse Woodrow Wilson in Rome, Georgia, on family business. At that time, she was keeping house for her widowed father. Woodrow Wilson thought of Ellen, "What splendid laughing eyes!" They were engaged 5 months later, but postponed the wedding while he did postgraduate work at Johns Hopkins University and she nursed her ailing father. Ellen's father committed suicide while hospitalized for depression, after which she went North to study at the Art Students League of New York.

Wilson, who was 28 years of age, married Ellen, age 25, on June 24, 1885, at her paternal grandparents' home in Savannah, Georgia. The wedding was performed jointly by his father, the Reverend Joseph R. Wilson, and her grandfather, the Reverend Isaac Stockton Keith Axson. They honeymooned at Waynesville, a mountain resort in western North Carolina.

That same year, Bryn Mawr College in Pennsylvania offered Dr. Wilson a teaching position at an annual salary of $1,500. He and his bride lived near the campus, keeping her little brother with them.

Together, the Wilsons had three daughters:
Margaret Woodrow Wilson (1886–1944) - singer, businesswoman, Hindu nun (1940–44)
Jessie Woodrow Wilson (1887–1933) - she worked three years at a settlement house in Philadelphia. She married Francis B. Sayre at the White House in 1913. They settled at Cambridge, Massachusetts, when Sayre joined the faculty of Harvard Law School. Jessie was active in the League of Women Voters, the YWCA, and as secretary of the Massachusetts Democratic Committee.
 Eleanor Randolph Wilson (1889–1967), she married Secretary of the Treasury William Gibbs McAdoo.

Insisting that her children must not be born as Yankees, Ellen went to stay with relatives in Gainesville, Georgia for Margaret's birth in 1886 and Jessie's in 1887. But Eleanor was born in Connecticut in 1889, while Wilson was teaching at Wesleyan University.

Wilson's career at Princeton University began in 1890, bringing Ellen new social responsibilities. She took refuge from such demands in her art. As First Lady, she drew sketches and painted in a studio set up on the third floor of the White House. She donated much of her work to charity. She arranged the White House weddings of two of her daughters.

After Wilson was elected as president in 1912, the Wilsons preferred to begin the administration without an inaugural ball. The First Lady's entertainments were simple, but her unaffected cordiality made her parties successful. In their first year, she convinced her scrupulous husband that it would be perfectly proper to invite influential legislators to a private dinner.

Wilson had grown up in a slave-owning family. As First Lady, she devoted much effort to the cause of improving housing in the national capital's largely black slums. She visited dilapidated alleys and brought them to the attention of debutantes and Congressmen.

She died of Bright's disease at the White House on August 6, 1914. She was buried in Rome, Georgia among her family at Myrtle Hill Cemetery.

In December 1915, President Woodrow Wilson remarried, to Edith Bolling Galt.

See also
 Letitia Christian Tyler
 Caroline Harrison

References

Further reading

External links
  discusses Ellen Wilson with particular attention to her painting
 
 

1860 births
1914 deaths
19th-century American women
20th-century American women
Deaths from nephritis
First Ladies and Gentlemen of New Jersey
First ladies of the United States
People from Princeton, New Jersey
People from Rome, Georgia
People from Savannah, Georgia
Woodrow Wilson family
Art Students League of New York alumni
20th-century American people